A heritage asset is an item that has value because of its contribution to a nation’s society, knowledge and/or culture. They are usually physical assets, but some countries also use the term in relation to intangible social and spiritual inheritance.
The term is found in several contexts:
 In a formal accounting sense
 In the UK planning process
 By museums, artistic and cultural organisations to describe collections in their care.

Accounting definition
A tangible asset with historical, artistic, scientific, technological, geophysical or environmental qualities that is held and maintained principally for its contribution to knowledge and culture.

Heritage assets are accounted for as a distinct category because their value is unlikely to be fully reflected in a financial value or price. Many are unique, meaning their value may increase, rather than depreciate, even if the physical condition deteriorates. Also, heritage assets may incur high costs to maintain them and their life might be measured in hundreds of years.

Heritage assets are often described as ‘inalienable’, because the holder cannot sell or dispose of them without external consent. These restrictions may be formed in law, for example, trust law relating to a charity’s governing documents. Some argue that inalienability means that assets held in trust are not actually assets of the organisation that holds them. However, the UK Financial Reporting Council states that inalienable assets meet the definition of an asset because they may be used to generate income (e.g. attracting visitors to a museum) and have service potential.

The UK government publishes a list of heritage assets that are tax exempt.

Planning definition
The term ‘heritage asset’ is used in the UK to describe a range of geographical components of the historic environment which have been positively identified as having a degree of significance meriting consideration in planning decisions.

These include listed buildings; old buildings that are not listed but still have local historical importance; scheduled monuments; war memorials; historic wreck sites; parks; historic gardens; conservation areas, archaeological sites and so on. They also include places and properties that are not formally protected through the designation system, and certain historic landscapes.  The term 'heritage asset' is often used as a convenient collective term for all these items.

Not all heritage assets are legally protected through the designation system.

Only those that have special interest or national importance are protected through a range of separate pieces of legislation as either scheduled monuments; listed buildings; registered parks and gardens; registered battlefields; historic wrecks or conservation areas. However, many locally important heritage assets, which do not meet the criteria for national designation, are noted in local council lists, on local ‘heritage asset registers’ and on 'Historic Environment Records'. These are referred to in local and regional planning policies.
'Heritage environment records'(HERs) are also sometimes called 'Sites and Monuments Records'.

Two-thirds of all heritage assets are said to be privately owned, which reflects the fact that they are often small houses and local sites, rather than just big public buildings.

The Penfold Review of non-planning consents agreed that the recommendations outlined in the Draft Heritage Protection Bill 2009 should be adopted. This would result in a simpler (and hopefully faster and less expensive) planning system.

Cultural definition
The term heritage asset is less commonly used within a cultural context. The UK Highways Agency has developed a series of Cultural Heritage Assets Management Plans (CHAMP) which are designed to protect and enhance the historic environment surrounding the Strategic Road Network.    Manchester University uses the term ‘cultural asset’ for its museums and art gallery collections.

The term is more frequently used in Canada and Australia where it refers to works of art; rituals, ceremonies and aural heritage (i.e. stories and folklore).

See also
 Cultural heritage
 Sites and monuments record

References

External links
  Introductions to Heritage Assets

Archaeology of the United Kingdom
Architecture in the United Kingdom
 
 
Town and country planning in the United Kingdom
Heritage registers in the United Kingdom
English Heritage